"I Won't Say (I'm in Love)" is a song written by composer Alan Menken and lyricist David Zippel for Disney's animated film Hercules (1997). Included on the film's soundtrack, the song is performed by American actress and singer Susan Egan in her role as Meg, Hercules' love interest, while singers Cheryl Freeman, Lillias White, Vaneese Thomas, LaChanze and Roz Ryan provide girl group-style backup vocals as the Muses.

"I Won't Say (I'm in Love)" is a mid-tempo doo-wop and pop ballad reminiscent of 1950s music that incorporates Motown and R&B influences. Similar in style to songs recorded by American girl groups the Ronettes and the Supremes, its lyrics are about denying having romantic feelings for someone and parody those of traditional love songs. In its accompanying musical sequence, Meg refuses to admit she is falling in love with Hercules, while the Muses insist that she embrace her romantic feelings for him instead. "I Won't Say (I'm in Love)" was written to replace "I Can't Believe My Heart", a slower, more emotional ballad Menken had originally intended for Meg; the latter song was discarded because Meg's animator Ken Duncan felt it did not complement her strong personality. Menken based "I Won't Say (I'm in Love)" on songs he wrote for his musical Little Shop of Horrors (1982).

"I Won't Say (I'm in Love)" has been positively received by both film and music critics, who enjoyed its girl group-inspired arrangement, as well as Egan's sultry delivery and the song's refreshing difference from traditional Disney ballads; some critics even dubbed it the film's best song. While not one of Disney's most popular songs, "I Won't Say (I'm in Love)" has developed a reputation as one of the studio's most underappreciated. American singer Belinda Carlisle recorded a pop rock version of "I Won't Say (I'm in Love)" for the film's soundtrack. American girl group the Cheetah Girls covered the song in 2005.

Background and context 
"I Won't Say (I'm in Love)" was written by composer Alan Menken and lyricist David Zippel. Menken originally composed a "soaring" ballad entitled "I Can't Believe My Heart" for Meg to sing in the film, which he had intended to serve as a solo conveying the heroine falling in love with Hercules. However, Meg's supervising animator Ken Duncan disagreed with Menken's song because he believed the character was "too tough" and "hardened by life" to perform such a soft ballad. The writers agreed that Meg "wasn’t a ballad kind of girl." Therefore, Menken was prompted to write "I Won't Say (I'm in Love)", the style of which he based on the girl group songs he had written for his stage musical Little Shop of Horrors (1982), with which "I Can't Believe My Heart" was ultimately replaced. Although she enjoyed the first song, actress and singer Susan Egan, who voices Meg, agreed that the slower "I Can't Believe My Heart" was "too straightforward and literal", whereas "I Won't Say (I'm in Love)" expresses a similar meaning, albeit "the way Meg would—without admitting any of it."Egan joked that although "I Won't Say (I'm in Love)" was "fun" to perform, she felt much more "white" than usual recording alongside the five black singers cast as the Muses, who provide the song's back up vocals. Familiar with singers Cheryl Freeman, Lillias White, Vaneese Y. Thomas, LaChanze and Roz Ryan's Broadway work, Egan felt intimidated by their powerful voices and riffing abilities. Egan recalled, "Alan would say, 'Okay Lillias (White), just do a riff over there and LaChanze, you do a little something over here and Susan, just at the end, get from this note to this note and just do a riff.' I raise my hand and I'm like, 'Umm, can you plunk it out on the piano?' He looks at me like, 'Are you kidding?'" While it took Egan half an hour to solidify only one of her riffs, the other singers recorded multiple takes of theirs within that same time; Egan was greatly humbled by the experience, having never riffed in her previous singing roles. On the film's soundtrack, only Egan and Freeman are credited as vocalists on the track. Menken also produced the song. Danny Troob arranged the song while Michael Kosarin conducted the orchestration.

Audiences learn that Meg has been in love before, only for her boyfriend to leave her for another woman after selling her soul to Hades to save his life. Like most Disney heroines, Meg sings about falling in love with the film's hero, a revelation Meg is too proud to admit. "I Won't Say (I'm in Love)" expresses Meg's conflicting feelings about Hercules, who she insists she does not love, only for her claims to constantly be refuted by the Muses. Recognized as Meg's signature song, "I Won't Say (I'm in Love)" uncovers the "misunderstood nature" of the character. Falling in love too quickly was a negative experience for Meg that has left her hesitant and in denial. Despite her best efforts, the character realizes she has in fact begun to develop feelings for Hercules much to her chagrin, which she refuses to admit at first. The song allows Meg to work through such denial, by "alternating between fantasizing about how delightful it would be to be loved by Herc, and stomping her foot in anger at the very thought." Resembling an "admonishing" exchange between Meg and the Muses, "I Won't Say (I'm in Love)" is Meg's attempt to avoid the clichéd storylines of her predecessors. Finally, after strolling through a Greek courtyard while performing the song accompanied by the Muses who insist she is in denial, the character's resistance eventually proves futile and she ultimately relents, the Muses having "taunt[ed] her into honesty". "I Won't Say (I'm in Love)" is also the only song in which the Muses duet with one of the film's main characters. Excerpts from "I Won't Say (I'm in Love)" are also used in some of the film's score, one of the few songs to do this.

Filmtracks.com described "I Won't Say (I'm in Love)" as the film's "standard 'female song of longing'." According to Taylor Weatherby of Billboard, the character "finally comes to a conclusion to which many a girl (or guy) can relate". Tracy Dye of Bustle described the scene: "Joined by The Muses, Meg attempts to vehemently deny her amour for Hercules". Writing for film critic Eric D. Snider's website, Kimber Kay joked that Meg "tries her best to give a top 40 rendition of her solo song, but it gets stolen by the magnificent Muses." Additionally, the musical number predicts that one of Hercules' most difficult challenges will be trying to change Meg's opinion of him. Writing for The Daily Dot, Aja Romano cited the song as Meg's "I Want" song. In addition to her conflicted feelings about Hercules, "I Won't Say (I'm in Love)" also demonstrates Meg's independence.

Music and lyrics 

At a duration of two minutes and twenty seconds, "I Won't Say (I'm in Love)" was written in the key of C major at a tempo of 100 beats per minute. Performed "freely" in the style of a mellow, 1950s girl group song, the power ballad features Egan's sultry vocals. Adhering to the R&B motif Menken uses throughout the soundtrack, the pop ballad incorporates elements of rhythm and blues and doo-wop. Featuring "cooing shooby-doos and sha-la-las" from the Muses, who contribute "gospel-tinged" back up vocals and riffs to the track, Jeffrey Gantz of the Boston Phoenix compared Egan's vocals to girl group The Ronettes. Describing "I Won't Say (I'm in Love)" as "a traditional Disney [heroine's] lament," Vulture.com's Lindsey Weber compared its "unique Motown edge" to the work of the Supremes. Musically, Irving Tan of Sputnikmusic described the teen pop-influenced track as "the closest the Herculean villa ever comes to approximating a Broadway show", while Ella Ceron of Thought Catalog called it "a pop song made on Olympus." Allison Shoemaker of Consequence of Sound likened the Muses to a Greek chorus. Identifying the track as a "self-aware ballad", author Thomas S. Hischak observed that the song maintains the soundtrack's comedic tone in his book 100 Greatest American and British Animated Films. Combined, Egan and the Muses' vocals span two octaves, from G3 to C5. Chelsea Fagan of Thought Catalog described Egan's voice as "sarcastic" and "smoky", while Billboard's Taylor Weatherby called it "soulfully belt[ed]". Although the Muses are voiced by five singers, the song is only performed in three-part harmony.
Lyrically, "I Won't Say (I'm in Love) is a love song about denial, specifically one's reluctance to fall in love or succumb to romantic clichés. Meg voices how cliché and insufficient love can feel. Parodying classic love songs, "I Won't Say (I'm in Love)" differs from typical Disney love songs by offering "a unique spin" on the singer's situation. Rob Burch of The Hollywood News dubbed "I Won't Say (I'm in Love)" an "anti-love song". Described as an "emotional barnstormer", the song begins with Egan singing the lyrics "If there's a prize for rotten judgment I guess I've already won that", which is followed by "Been there, done that". Thought Catalog's Chelsea Fagan believes the first verse "sums up in four lines everything that we’ve ever tried to convey while on our third drink out at the bar with the girls", joking, "I believe this song would come shortly after dancing in a circle with all women, but just before the tearful texting of your ex". Meg also sings the line "My head is screaming ‘get a grip, girl!’ unless you're dying to cry your heart out." Comparing the background vocals to The Blossoms, Musicological Identities: Essays in Honor of Susan McClary author Jacqueline Warwick observed that the backup singers constantly contradict the lead singer in a call and response format, proving crucial to the theme as the lead vocalist is denying exactly what the background singers and listeners believe. The Muses suggest that Meg “Face it like a grown-up/When you gonna own up that you got got got it bad”, which Gantz described "admonishing". The song's last line is: "At least out loud, I won’t say I’m in love."

Kate Knibbs of The Ringer summarized the track as "a love song from someone who doesn’t want to be in love, who knows enough to assume things aren’t going to work out." Fagan believes the song expresses "the hesitancy savvy women everywhere feel when trying to stop themselves from falling head over heels". Calling the song a "self-aware ballad", The Oxford Companion to the American Musical: Theatre, Film, and Television author Thomas S. Hischak observed that its lyrics are "filled with sly anachronisms". Meanwhile, in his book The Disney Song Encyclopedia, Hischak referred to "I Won't Say (I'm in Love)" as a "contradictory love song ... in which Meg denies her true feelings yet admits that she is quite taken with the brawny and naive hero Hercules". According to D23, "I Won't Say (I'm in Love)" is a love song "For those who don’t want to admit their hearts’ desires," as the protagonist refuses to admit her true feelings for her love interest until the very last lyric.

Reception 
"I Won't Say (I'm in Love)" has been acclaimed by both film and music critics. Aja Romano of The Daily Dot hailed the song as a Hercules highlight that "satisfies us every time". Writing for Indiewire, Greg Ehbar cited "I Won't Say (I'm in Love)" as his favorite track, describing it as one of the film's "truly great tunes". Irving Tan of Sputnikmusic was particularly complementary, calling the song "the ultimate pantheon of Grecian achievement". Tan felt the Muses "prov[e] that their pillow talk skills are right up there with the best of them", concluding, "The track also works well as an alternative to modern pop's teenage heartbreak music" and advising listeners to "ditch Hilary Duff and play this instead". Tracy Dye of Bustle hailed the track as "one of Disney's most addictive pieces of ear-candy," appreciating that "it veers from the typical love-laced ballads we're used to". Rob Burch of The Hollywood News described "I Won't Say (I'm in Love)" as a "refreshing change of pace". Nylon's Taylor Bryant called the song "both impeccable and very much in line with the company's ethos". Jerrica Tisdale of CinemaBlend crowned "I Won't Say (I'm in Love)" the best song from Hercules, describing it as "memorable, because it’s a love song disguised as an anti-love song". Screen Rant ranked "I Won't Say (I'm in Love)" Hercules' second best song, with author Matthew Wilkinson praising it for complimenting Meg's independence and Egan's vocals. Conversely, Filmtracks.com accused the song of wasting Egan's vocal talents.

Beamly ranked the song fifth on the website's list of "Best Ever Disney Songs", with author Sophie Hall nicknaming Meg "The Celine Dion of the cartoon world". BuzzFeed ranked "I Won't Say (I'm in Love)" 14th in its "Definitive Ranking Of The 102 Best Animated Disney Songs". BuzzFeed also ranked the song Disney's ninth greatest love song, while D23 named it 10th in a similar ranking. Billboard named the song the 21st best song of the Disney Renaissance. Consequence of Sound ranked the ballad the 61st best Disney song of all time, with contributor Allison Shoemaker describing the track as "a terrific Motown ballad and a great piece of musical character development". Ranking it Disney's 36th best song, The Ringer welcomed "I Won't Say (I'm in Love)" as "a refreshing change of pace for Disney" that in turn makes Meg "a relatable queen." Ticketmaster contributor Caitlin Devlin declared "I Won't Say (I'm in Love)" "one of Disney’s best songs of all time".

"I Won't Say (I'm in Love)" has garnered a reputation as one of Disney's most underrated songs, with the New York Post including it on their list of Disney's best underrated songs. While ranking the track the 16th best song of the Disney Renaissance, Syfy Wire's Caitlin Busch called Meg "an underrated heroine with an underrated love song", which she described as "funny, poignant, and a perfect transition song." The author identified "Face it like a grown-up/When you gonna own up that you got got got it bad" as its best lyric. The Odyssey ranked the track Disney's most underrated song, out of 13. Moviepilot included the song in a similar article, with author Jeremiah Paul describing it as a "hidden gem" which "should have been another classic", while praising Egan's performance. Jerrica Tisdale of CinemaBlend described the song's lack of popularity as "nearly criminal". Calling it one of Disney's 12 most underrated classics, Billboard's Aly Semigran wrote that the song deserves to be a "karaoke mainstay". In an interview with The Fader, members of American rapper Chance the Rapper's band The Social Experiment ranked "I Won't Say (I'm in Love)" one of the favorite Disney songs from their childhood, calling it "an amazing song". TodayTix named the song "everyone’s favorite Disney feminist anthem".

Personnel 
 Lead vocals by Susan Egan as Megara
 Background vocals by Cheryl Freeman, Lillias White, Vaneese Thomas, LaChanze and Roz Ryan as the Muses
 Instrumentation by the Disney Orchestra

Live performances and cover versions
Egan has performed "I Won't Say (I'm in Love)" live on several occasions. At the 2017 D23 Expo to conclude the event's "Zero to Hero: The Making of Hercules" panel, the original animated sequence was played in the background while Egan sang, accompanied by backup vocalists. The performance was met with a standing ovation from the audience. Egan has also sang the song during the Broadway Princess Party concert series in 2019 and 2020. During an October 2019 performance, Egan performed a duet arrangement with actress Krysta Rodriguez, who originated the role of Meg in a stage adaptation of Hercules (2019) and sang the song in the show. In April 2020, Egan performed "I Won't Say (I'm in Love)" as part of Disney’s #DisneySingAlong social media campaign. The video was recorded in her own home due to quarantining measures as a result of the COVID-19 pandemic, while Broadway actors Courtney Reed, Laura Osnes, Adam J. Levy and Benjamin Rauhala provided background vocals as The Muses.

To promote the film, American singer Belinda Carlisle recorded a pop rock cover of "I Won't Say (I'm in Love)" in 1997, which was included on the film's soundtrack. Produced by Gary Wallis and Toby Chapman, Carlisle's version was released as a single exclusively in France and Germany, on May 26, 1997. The single garnered critical acclaim. American girl group The Cheetah Girls covered the song for the 2005 compilation album Disneymania 3 marking the group's first song as a trio. Their version exchanges harmonizing for handclaps while emphasizing the pop aspects of the song over R&B. The cover was released as a single. Writing for idobi, Sam Devotta felt The Cheetah Girls' version "lacks the power [and frustration] of the original", preferring Egan's interpretation. An abridged version of "I Won't Say (I'm in Love)" appears on stage in the jukebox musical Disney's on the Record, performed by Andrew Samonsky, with Meredith Inglesby, Andy Karl, Tyler Maynard and Keewa Nurullah providing backup vocals. Singer and music teacher Evynne Hollens released a cover of "I Won't Say (I'm in Love)" as a single in 2017.

In April 2020, singer Ariana Grande performed a cover of the song on the ABC special Disney Family Singalong. Grande's rendition received acclaim from critics and fans. Billboard named Grande's performance as one of the 10 best moments from the special, stating that Grande "got in full make up and costume, paying homage to Meg by wearing all purple, for the tender and vocally stunning video that she completed with a flower as her only prop. But with a voice like hers, what more do you need?"  Bill Keveney of USA Today stated that Grande had "the most professional-looking performance". Monica Sisavat of Popsugar praised Grande's rendition calling it a "gorgeous rendition of Hercules's "I Won't Say I'm in Love" from her home."

Certifications

References

External links

1990s ballads
1997 singles
Disney Renaissance songs
1997 songs
Ariana Grande songs
Belinda Carlisle songs
The Cheetah Girls songs
Disney songs
Hercules (franchise)
Doo-wop songs
Love themes
Pop ballads
Rhythm and blues ballads
Songs with lyrics by David Zippel
Songs with music by Alan Menken
Walt Disney Records singles
Song recordings produced by Alan Menken